No. 235 Squadron RAF was an anti-submarine squadron of the Royal Air Force in World War I and in World War II served as a squadron in RAF Coastal Command.

History

Formation and World War I
No. 235 Squadron RAF was formed at Newlyn, Cornwall on 20 August 1918 from the former No. 424 and 425 flights RNAS, and was equipped with Short 184 seaplanes for anti-submarine patrols. It flew these until the Armistice on 11 November 1918. The squadron disbanded three months later, on 22 February 1919.

Reformation and World War II
It reformed at RAF Manston on 30 October 1939 as a fighter squadron, but was equipped at first with Fairey Battle light bombers for training purposes, which were in February 1940 replaced by Bristol Blenheims. The squadron then transferred to Coastal Command and later moved RAF Dyce in June 1941. In December 1941 the squadron began re-equipping with the Bristol Beaufighter, and in May 1942 moved to RAF Docking. In July 1942 the squadron moved to RAF Chivenor, and then returned to RAF Leuchars, Scotland, in January 1943. In August 1943 the squadron returned again to South West England, in preparation for the D-Day landings, later operating Atlantic anti-submarine patrols from RAF St Angelo in Northern Ireland. The squadron re-equipped in June 1944 with the de Havilland Mosquito and moved to RAF Banff in September 1944, joining the "Banff Strike Wing". The squadron disbanded on 10 July 1945.

Aircraft operated

References

Notes

Bibliography

 Bowyer, Michael J.F. and John D.R. Rawlings. Squadron Codes, 1937–56. Cambridge, UK: Patrick Stephens Ltd., 1979. .
 Flintham, Vic and Andrew Thomas. Combat Codes: A full explanation and listing of British, Commonwealth and Allied air force unit codes since 1938. Shrewsbury, Shropshire, UK: Airlife Publishing Ltd., 2003. .
 Halley, James J. The Squadrons of the Royal Air Force & Commonwealth 1918–1988. Tonbridge, Kent, UK: Air Britain (Historians) Ltd., 1988. .
 Jefford, C.G. RAF Squadrons, a Comprehensive record of the Movement and Equipment of all RAF Squadrons and their Antecedents since 1912. Shrewsbury, Shropshire, UK: Airlife Publishing, 1988 (second edition 2001). .
 Rawlings, John D.R. Coastal, Support and Special Squadrons of the RAF and their Aircraft. London: Jane's Publishing Company Ltd., 1982. .
 Rawlings, John D.R. Fighter Squadrons of the RAF and their Aircraft. London: Macdonald & Jane's (Publishers) Ltd., 1969 (2nd edition 1976, reprinted 1978). .

External links

 Squadron history on MOD site
 Squadron historie on RafWeb

Aircraft squadrons of the Royal Air Force in World War II
235
Military units and formations established in 1918
Military units and formations disestablished in 1945
1918 establishments in the United Kingdom